Metroweb S.p.A. is a fiber-optic network operator based in Milan, Italy. In 2011 it was acquired by F2i Metropolis, a sub-holding company for F2i First Fund (via F2i Reti TLC) and Intesa Sanpaolo (via IMI Investimenti). The current owner of the company was Metroweb Italia, a sub-holding company for F2i First Fund and Italian Strategic Fund.

References

External links
 

Telecommunications companies established in 1997
Companies based in Milan
Telecommunications companies of Italy
Government-owned companies of Italy
Private equity portfolio companies
Italian  companies established in 1997